The 2013 Copa do Brasil de Futebol Feminino was the seventh staging of the competition. The competition started on February 2, 2013, and concluded on May 4, 2013. 32 clubs of all regions of Brazil participated of the cup, which is organized by the Brazilian Football Confederation (CBF).

Competition format
The competition was contested by 32 clubs in a knock-out format where all rounds were played over two legs and the away goals rule was used, but in the first three rounds, if the away team won the first leg with an advantage of at least three goals, the second leg would not be played and the club automatically qualified to the next round.

Table

1.  Sergipe withdrew the competition.

Final

References

External links
Official website

2013
2013 domestic association football cups
2013 Brazilian football competitions
Copa